Lee Kang-Won (Hangul: 이강원; born 5 May 1990) is a South Korean male volleyball player. He is part of the South Korea men's national volleyball team. On club level he plays for the Daejeon Samsung Fire Bluefangs.

Career

As a junior at Kyunghee University in 2012, Lee was selected for the South Korean collegiate national team to compete at the 2012 Asian Men's Cup Volleyball Championship, where the team finished in fifth place. He competed in the 2013 Summer Universiade in Kazan, Russia, and was the flag-bearer for his nation during the opening ceremonies of those games.

In 2017 Lee got called up to the senior national squad for the first time and competed at the 2017 FIVB World League where he played as the starting opposite hitter in all nine games.

References

External links
 Profile at FIVB.org

1990 births
Living people
Sportspeople from Daegu
South Korean men's volleyball players
21st-century South Korean people